The Blood Order, officially known as the Decoration in Memory of 9 November 1923, was one of the most prestigious decorations in the Nazi Party (NSDAP). During March 1934, Hitler authorized the Blood Order to commemorate the 9 November 1923 coup attempt of the Nazi Party. The medal is silver, with the obverse bearing a depiction of an eagle grasping an oak leaf wreath. Inside the wreath is the date  and to the right is the inscription . The reverse shows the entrance of the Feldherrnhalle in relief (where the coup ended in defeat), and directly above is the angled swastika with sun rays in the background. Along the top edge is the inscription:  ("And after all, you won").

History
The first issue of the decoration, struck in 99% pure silver, was awarded to 1,500 participants in the putsch who had also been members of the Nazi Party or one of its formations before January 1932 (continuous service), or had been cadets from the Munich Infantry School who marched in support of Ludendorff. All medals were numbered (except Hitler's and Göring's) and awarding was done very carefully. Unlike other medals, the ribbon was worn on the right breast of the uniform tunic in the form of a rosette and the medal sometimes was pinned on and suspended below.
  
In May 1938, to the dismay of the putsch participants, the award was extended to persons who had (a) served time in prison for Nazi activities before 1933, (b) received a death sentence which was later commuted to life imprisonment for Nazi activities before 1933, or (c) been severely wounded in the service of the Party before 1933; subsequently it was further extended to members of the Austrian Nazi Party who had participated in the 1934 February Uprising or July Putsch, or who had received significant prison time or injuries for Nazi activities.  It could also be bestowed on certain other individuals at the discretion of Adolf Hitler, the last recipient being Reinhard Heydrich (posthumous). These subsequent medals were struck in 80% silver with serial numbers above 1500 and did not carry the maker's name (J. FUESS MÜNCHEN) as the Type I medals did.

If a holder of this medal left the party, the medal would have to be relinquished.

In total 16 women received the award, two from the 'Altreich' (Eleonore Baur and Emma Schneider) and 14 from Austria. Given the number of original marchers in the putsch, the number of awards given under the 1938 extensions (436), and the awards for outstanding service under those same extensions, the total number of recipients numbered fewer than 6,000.

In November 1936, Hitler gave new "orders" for the "Orders and Awards" of Nazi Germany. The top NSDAP awards are listed in this order: 1. Coburg Badge; 2. Nürnberg Party Badge of 1929; 3. SA Treffen at Brunswick 1931; 4. Golden Party Badge; 5. Blood Order; followed by the Gau badges and the Golden HJ Badge.

Selected Recipients 

 Max Amann
 Eleonore Baur
 Joseph Berchtold
 Johannes Block
 Martin Bormann
 Kuno-Hans von Both
 Philipp Bouhler
 Wilhelm Bruckner
 Walter Buch
 Karl-Heinz Bürger
 Kurt Daluege
 Eduard Dietl
 Sepp Dietrich
 Franz Xaver Dorsch
 Anton Drexler
 Hermann Esser
 Karl Fiehler
 Josef Fitzthum
 Hans Frank
 Wilhelm Frick
 Albert Ganzenmüller
 Ernst Girzick
 Hermann Göring
 Ulrich Graf
 Jakob Grimminger
 Edmund Heines
 Walter Hewel
 Reinhard Heydrich (posthumous, June 1942)
 Heinrich Himmler (withdrawn, April 1945)
 Friedrich Hildebrandt
 Hans Hinkel
 Adolf Hitler
 Adolf Hühnlein
 Ernst Kaltenbrunner
 Emil Ketterer
 Günther Korten
 Werner Kreipe
 Theodor Kretschmer
 Wilhelm Friedrich Loeper
 Erich Ludendorff
 Emil Maurice
 Josef Albert Meisinger
 Heinz Pernet
 Karl-Jesko von Puttkamer
 Helmuth Raithel
 Friedrich Josef Rauch
 Ernst Röhm
 Alfred Rosenberg
 Julian Scherner
 Julius Schreck 
 Walter Schultze
 Franz Xaver Schwarz
 Franz Schwede
 Julius Streicher
 Adolf Wagner
 Robert Heinrich Wagner
 Karl Wahl
 Friedrich Weber
 Wilhelm Weiss

References

Notes

Citations

Bibliography

Further reading

Orders, decorations, and medals of Nazi Germany
Beer Hall Putsch
Long service medals
Awards established in 1934
1934 establishments in Germany
German campaign medals